Lost in Alphaville is the third full-length studio album by The Rentals, released on August 25, 2014, through Polyvinyl Records. The album is available on CD, vinyl, cassette and as a digital download. It marks the band's first full-length album since their 1999 release Seven More Minutes and their first-ever release through Polyvinyl, with whom they signed in December 2013.

Background and recording
After The Rentals disbanded following the tour for 1999's Seven More Minutes, the band reunited in 2005 and released The Last Little Life EP as well as four mini-albums as part of their multimedia project Songs About Time throughout 2009.

On December 5, 2013, Matt Sharp announced that The Rentals had signed with Polyvinyl Records for the release of their forthcoming studio album, which would be their first full-length in 15 years. The album, recorded in Los Angeles, Nashville and New Orleans, is mostly made up of newly rerecorded songs from Songs About Time and  features The Black Keys' drummer Patrick Carney, Lucius' Jess Wolfe and Holly Laessig on vocals, Ozma's guitarist Ryen Slegr and Lauren Chipman of The Section Quartet on viola and piano. Sharp and the band are credited with producing the album and it was mixed by Grammy-winning producer Dave Sardy.

Critical reception

Lost in Alphaville received mostly positive feedback from music critics. At Metacritic, which assigns a normalized rating out of 100 to reviews from mainstream critics, the album has an average score of 69 out of 100, which indicates "generally favorable reviews" based on 13 reviews.

Tim Sendra of AllMusic called the album "a huge-sounding modern indie rock album with a glossy sheen on the surface, but all kinds of heart beating just below." Giving the album an eight out of ten rating, Jeff Milo of Paste wrote, "It’s far from the slapped-together shambolic style of '90s power-pop; no, this sounds much more arranged, almost like tightened chamber pop if it were clouded by the murk of shoegaze."

Track listing

Personnel
Credits adapted from AllMusic:

The Rentals
Matt Sharp – vocals, bass guitar, synthesizers
Jess Wolfe – vocals
Holly Laessig – vocals
Ryen Slegr – guitars, lap steel guitar
Patrick Carney – drums, percussion
Lauren Chipman – Fender Rhodes, organ, piano, viola, violin

Additional musicians
Joey Santiago – guitar
Danielle Belén – violin
Jamie Blake – breathing, vocal effect
Roger Moutenot – percussion
Dan Joeright – drum loop, percussion
The West Los Angeles Children's Choir

Technical personnel
The Rentals – production
Matt Sharp – engineer, production
Roger Moutenot – engineer
Adam Bednarik – engineer
Dave Sardy – mixing
Patrick Doyle – engineer, preparation engineer
Andy Brohard – mixing
Cameron Barton – mixing assistant
Ryan Smith – mastering
Lauren Chipman – choir director
Bryan Bos – artwork, design
Tim Reynolds – artwork, design

Charts

Release history

References

2014 albums
The Rentals albums
Polyvinyl Record Co. albums